Richmond College is one of the eight residential colleges of Murray State University.  The college was established in the fall of 1996 when Murray State became the one of the first public universities in the United States to establish a campus-wide residential college system.

Old Richmond Hall

The original Richmond Hall dormitory was built in 1960 at a cost of $704,438, intended to be used as an all-male dormitory designed to house 242. Richmond Hall and Richmond College are both named in honor of James H. Richmond, who served as the third president of the university, then known as Murray State Teachers College, from 1936 until 1945. It was the first of several new residential structures that would make up an area on campus then known as Orchard Heights. The living quarters for students were suite-style with each set of two double rooms sharing a small bathroom. They were located on four floors with one lounge for studying or socializing at the center of each of the floors. Living quarters for the residence director and a library were separated from the main building by a glass walkway. In early fall of 2000, the building was wired for high-speed internet access, and the natural beige color of the brick exterior was painted red. The painting of most of the residential colleges in 2000 was criticized by many as an unnecessary expense that did not improve the look of the buildings.

In September of 2019, with the reopening of New Richmond, MSU's Board of Regents voted to demolish the unoccupied Old Richmond Hall. Demolition began on 23 December 2019.

New Richmond Hall 
Plans to replace old Richmond Hall were first drafted in the late 1990s, and a new building was to be constructed near Hamilton Field. Budget problems put an end to the original plan, and by 2003 a new plan was under development for a new combined Richmond and Clark Hall on Chestnut Street near Regents and White Colleges. The proposed structure would have housed more than 500 students and cost more than $20 million to build. The plan was met with criticism from students who believed that combining two residential colleges would decrease each college's individual identity and uniqueness. Plans called for the new combined residential college to be completed as early as fall 2005. Once again, budget problems killed the plan, and the university dropped the combined college proposal and moved forward with construction of a new Clark Hall near Winslow Dining Hall in 2006.

The new Richmond Hall facility opened in time for the fall 2009 semester.

2017 explosion 
On June 28, 2017, at 4:53 p.m., an explosion at New Richmond destroyed two floors of the south wing of building and damaged nearby facilities, including shattering windows. Vibrations from the explosion were felt in the immediate area. No students were present in the dorm at the time due to summer break, but one Murray State employee was injured. The explosion was immediately thought to be the result of a gas leak, and the investigation following the incident revealed that a groundskeeper employed by Murray State had run over a natural gas regulator with a lawnmower earlier that morning.

The damage to the building was repaired for about $13 million, and the residence hall reopened for the fall 2019 semester.

Traditions

Intramural sports
Richmond fields several competitive intramural sports teams, including softball, flag football, volleyball, basketball, tennis, golf, and soccer. Richmond has always maintained an intense rivalry with Clark College, because for the first decade of the residential colleges existence, both colleges  were of approximately the same size and located in very close proximity.

Faculty dinners
Once each month, students and faculty members of Richmond College gather in the dining hall in an area identified by a large mobile Richmond coat of arms. They eat dinner together as a group and discuss a wide range of topics including academics and current events.

Richmond on the Green
Richmond on the Green is an annual college cookout that takes place each April. The event takes place on the quad near Pogue Library. The event is a time for students and faculty to interact prior to the close of the academic year.  In addition to the food served, croquet is also played. While food is available free of charge to members of the college, it is also sold to other non-Richmond students, with proceeds going to benefit Relay for Life.

College heads
 Nancy France (1996–1999)
 Rose Bogal-Allbritten (1999–2000)
 Oliver Muscio (2000–2008)
 Leon Bodevin (2008-2014)
 Lissa Grahm-Schneider (2014-2015)
 Jane Hall (2015-2016)
 Dr. Bassam Atieh (2016-present)

Residential College Council
The Residential College Council serves as the elected body that governs the residential college. The Council promotes the needs and rights of the members of the college, including adequate facilities, health and safety, academic and athletic events, participatory governance, and fair and judicious treatment of college residents.

Crest
Richmond's crest features a lion to symbolize willingness to fight and protect.

References 

University and college dormitories in the United States
Murray State University
Educational institutions established in 1996
1996 establishments in Kentucky